Acmaeodera sinuata is a species of metallic wood-boring beetle in the family Buprestidae. It is found in North America.

Subspecies
These two subspecies belong to the species Acmaeodera sinuata:
 Acmaeodera sinuata sexnotata Van Dyke, 1919
 Acmaeodera sinuata sinuata Van Dyke, 1919

References

Further reading

 
 
 

sinuata
Articles created by Qbugbot
Beetles described in 1919